Eric Tucker (1932–2018) was an English painter and draughtsman. He is best known for his depictions of working class social life in industrial North West England. The media have often described Tucker as the "secret Lowry".

He received no formal art education and left school at 14, working variously as a boxer, a steelworker, a gravedigger and a building labourer. Unknown during his lifetime, he made very few attempts to sell or show his work. Few beyond close family were aware that he painted. In his lifetime Tucker sold just two paintings.

His work came to public attention following his death in 2018, when he left behind a hoard of more than 400 paintings, and thousands of drawings, in his house in Warrington. Visitors queued around the block to see a two-day exhibition at Tucker's house. Following this, a 2019 retrospective at Warrington Museum & Art Gallery, titled Eric Tucker: The Unseen Artist, attracted record numbers of visitors to the gallery. In July 2021 two London art galleries Connaught Brown and Alon Zakaim exhibited 40 oils and watercolours.

Tucker was influenced by artists including Degas, Toulouse-Lautrec and Edward Burra.

Critics have compared Tucker to Edward Burra, L. S. Lowry, James Ensor, Julian Trevelyan and Eric Ravilious. Art critic Ruth Millington described Tucker's work as a 'significant contribution to modern British art'.

References 

20th-century English painters
People from North West England
1932 births
2018 deaths
British draughtsmen